A Common Thread (Brodeuses) is a 2004 French film directed by . The film is known as Sequins in the United States.

The film won "Critics Week Grand Prize" and "SACD Screenwriting Award" at the 2004 Cannes Film Festival. It is also nominated for "European Discovery of the Year" at the 2004 European Film Awards.

Plot
When Claire (played by Lola Naymark) learns that she is five months pregnant at the age of seventeen, she decides to keep the baby and not to tell the father (who seems to be married). Instead, she quits her current job at a local supermarket and goes to work as an assistant for Madame Mélikian (Ariane Ascaride), an embroiderer for haute couture. Mélikian has just lost her only son in a motorcycle accident. Claire shows her willingness in taking her duties, as well as taking over Mélikian's private order when she is treated in the hospital.

Cast
Lola Naymark  - Claire Moutiers
Ariane Ascaride  - Mme. Mélikian
Marie Félix  - Lucile
Thomas Laroppe  - Guillaume
Arthur Quehen  - Thomas
Jackie Berroyer  - M Lescuyer (as Jacky Berroyer)
Anne Canovas  - Mme. Lescuyer
Marina Tomé  - Gynecologist
Elisabeth Commelin  - Mme. Moutiers
Christophe Hatey  - Butcher
François Noël  - Bike Guy
Yasmine Modestine  - Nurse
Annie-Claude Sauton  - Baker
Nathalie Kirzin  - Round Woman
Ludivine Morissonaud  - Clotilde
Mark Valladolid - Jose Dela Cruz
Maria Aiza Nares - Sisang

Reception
"Whether the action involves gutting a live eel or stitching opalescent sequins to gossamer cloth, the camera is deployed with wisdom".
Lisa Nesselson, Variety

"A Common Thread is as delicate as the intricate needlework that both women are so passionate about".
Louise Keller, Urban Cinefile

Set in the picturesque French countryside A Common Thread is a touching, thought-provoking drama about the bond that forms between two women. Lola Naymark illuminates the screen with her striking, flame-red curls and eye-catching performance.

References

External links

2004 films
2004 drama films
Teenage pregnancy in film
French pregnancy films
2000s French films